

The C-Star class (sometimes written as C* class) of non-rigid airships or "blimps" were used by Britain's Royal Naval Air Service for convoy escort duties during World War I. Developed from the Coastal class (often referred to as the "C class"), the "*" in their designation indicated a modification of the original class  which they slowly replaced in service.

The C-Star class were slightly larger than their predecessors. With an endurance of up to 30 hours, and more powerful (and reliable) Renault engines, the C*s had the same basic layout as the Coastal Class, with the same trilobe envelope. However, the envelope tapered towards the rear, as on the SSZ class, which greatly improved stability, as did the larger control surfaces.

Operators

Royal Naval Air Service

Specifications

Notes

References
 London, P. (1999) U-Boat Hunters: Cornwall's Air War 1916–19 Dyllansow Truran, Truro.

External links
 C-star class on Airship Heritage Trust site

Airships of the United Kingdom
1910s British patrol aircraft